Discicristata is a proposed eukaryotic clade. It consists of Euglenozoa plus Percolozoa.

It was proposed that Discicristata plus Cercozoa yielded Cabozoa. Another proposal is to group Discicristata with Jakobida into Discoba superphylum.

See also
 Excavata

References

Excavata
Bikont unranked clades